Øglænd is a Norwegian surname. Notable people with the surname include:

Finn Øglænd (born 1957), Norwegian author, poet, translator, and literature critic
Jonas Øglænd (1847–1931), Norwegian merchant and industrial entrepreneur

Norwegian-language surnames